John Clayton may refer to:

Arts and entertainment

Writing
John Clayton (architect) (died 1861), English architect and writer
John Bell Clayton (c. 1907–1955), American writer
John Clayton (sportswriter) (1954–2022), American sportswriter and reporter
John J. Clayton, American fiction writer, teacher, and editor

Other media
John Clayton (painter) (1728–1800), English artist
John Clayton Adams (1840–1906), English landscape artist
John Clayton (Australian actor) (1940–2003), Australian actor
John Clayton (British actor) (1845–1888), British actor
John Clayton (bassist) (born 1952), American jazz bassist
John Clayton, Lord Greystoke, birthname of the fictional character Tarzan

Politics
John Clayton (Roundhead) (1620–?), English politician
John Clayton (d. 1737) (c. 1666–1737), British lawyer who became burgess and Attorney General of colonial Virginia 1714–1737
John Clayton (town clerk) (1792–1890), antiquarian and town clerk of Newcastle upon Tyne, England
John M. Clayton (1796–1856), U.S. Senator from Delaware and U.S. Secretary of State
John M. Clayton (Baker), a 1934 marble sculpture of the senator
John M. Clayton (Arkansas politician) (1840–1889), U.S. Representative from Arkansas, assassinated in 1889
John Clayton Allen (1860–1939), American politician

Sports
John Clayton (cricketer) (1857–1938), English cricketer
John Clayton (footballer, born 1961), Scottish footballer
John Clayton (footballer, born 1907), English footballer
John Clayton (rugby union) (1848–1924), England rugby union player

Other fields
John Clayton (botanist) (1694–1773), also Anglican minister and Gloucester County clerk, son of John Clayton (d. 1737) 
John Clayton (divine) (1709–1773), English cleric, Methodist and Jacobite
John Clayton (minister) (1754–1843), English Independent

See also
Jonny Clayton (born 1974), Welsh darts player
Jack Clayton (disambiguation)